Vigasio is a comune (municipality) in the Province of Verona in the Italian region Veneto, located about  west of Venice and about  southwest of Verona.

The municipality of Vigasio contains the frazioni (subdivisions, mainly villages and hamlets) Isolalta and Forette.

Vigasio borders the following municipalities: Buttapietra, Castel d'Azzano, Isola della Scala, Nogarole Rocca, Povegliano Veronese, Trevenzuolo, and Villafranca di Verona.

Composer Italo Montemezzi was a native of Vigasio.

Demographic evolution

References

External links
 www.comune.vigasio.vr.it/

Cities and towns in Veneto